The Central District of Gonabad County is a district (bakhsh) in Gonabad County, Razavi Khorasan Province, Iran. At the 2006 census, its population was 64,849, in 18,169 families.  The district has two cities: Gonabad and Bidokht.  The district has two rural districts (dehestan): Howmeh Rural District and Pas Kalut Rural District.

References 

Districts of Razavi Khorasan Province
Gonabad County